Robert Meade may refer to:

 Robert Henry Meade (1835–1898), head of the British Colonial Office
 Robert Leamy Meade (1842–1910), officer in the United States Marine Corps